Wort und Tat (Words and Deeds) is a 10-minute-long Nazi propaganda film directed by Fritz Hippler, which was released in 1938. The United States Holocaust Memorial Museum described the film as a "Propaganda film about the improved life of the German people under Hitler." The film is known for the extensive use of montage to get its message across, in a style reminiscent of Sergei Eisensteins Oktober. It was ordered by Joseph Goebbels.

The film begins with a montage of clips from the Weimar period, showing a series of clips of Labor and Communist rallies, interspersed with scenes of scantily clad cabaret girls, and then shots of the posters of the different Weimar era political parties. this illustrates the "chaos" and "decadence" of the Weimar period. This sequence ends with former chancellor Heinrich Brüning making a speech against National Socialism.

See also
List of German films 1933-1945

References

External links
 
Wort und Tat on the Internet Archive.

1938 documentary films
Black-and-white documentary films
1930s short documentary films
Films of Nazi Germany
German short documentary films
Nazi propaganda films
Films directed by Fritz Hippler
German black-and-white films
1938 films
1930s German-language films
1930s German films